Lieutenant General Paul Francis Wynnyk,  (born June 29, 1964) is a former Canadian Army officer who served from 2016 to 2018 as Commander of the Canadian Army. On July 16, 2018, he was named Vice Chief of the Defence Staff, until his resignation and retirement in July 2019.

Early life
Paul Wynnyk is of Ukrainian descent, the grandson of emigrants in Alberta from Radvantsi, Lviv region, in Western Ukraine. He was born in Edmonton on June 29, 1964, and was raised in the village of Breton, Alberta.

Military career
Wynnyk attended Royal Roads Military College and the Royal Military College of Canada, and he was commissioned into the Canadian Military Engineers in 1986. He became commanding officer of 1 Combat Engineer Regiment in Edmonton in 1997, commander of 1 Area Support Group in 2004 and Assistant Commanding General at the Combined Security Transition Command – Afghanistan in March 2009. He went on to be commander of Land Force Western Area in 2010, Deputy Commander of the Canadian Army in 2012 and Commander of the Canadian Forces Intelligence Command and Chief of Defence Intelligence in July 2014.

In January 2016, it was announced that he would become Chief of the Army Staff and Commander of the Canadian Army. In his speech during the ceremony, Wynnyk gave credit to his parents for supporting him on the path to this point in his career. "My mom Joan, who is here today, has watched and supported my journey in uniform from cub scout, to army cadet, to reservist, to regular officer," he said. About his late father Walter, Wynnyk said, "As both my high school principal and the commanding officer of my army cadet corps, it was he who encouraged me to embark upon a career of military service. On July 16, 2018, he was named Vice Chief of the Defence Staff. 

In July 2019, Wynnyk resigned as Vice Chief of the Defence Staff after he claimed that  Chief of the Defence Staff General Jonathan Vance planned to replace him as the Vice-Chief of the Defence Staff with Vice-Admiral Mark Norman. Wynnyk then claimed these plans were reversed when Vice-Admiral Norman settled with the government and retired from the military. Wynnyk was the fifth vice-chief to serve under Vance.

Post-military career
In October 2019, Wynnyk was appointed as Deputy Minister of Municipal Affairs for the Government of Alberta and became Deputy Minister of Health in 2021.

Awards and decorations
Wynnyk's personal awards and decorations include the following:

105px

20pxFile:CPSM Ribbon.png

100px

File:CD-ribbon and 2 bars.png

102px

 He was a qualified Paratrooper and as such wore the Canadian Forces Jump Wings with Red Maple Leaf
 Command Commendation

References

External links

|-

1963 births
Living people
Canadian military personnel from Alberta
Canadian generals
Commanders of the Order of Military Merit (Canada)
Recipients of the Meritorious Service Decoration
Canadian people of Ukrainian descent
Commanders of the Canadian Army
Royal Military College of Canada alumni
Royal Canadian Engineers officers
Canadian military personnel of the War in Afghanistan (2001–2021)
21st-century Canadian civil servants